Darko Vujović (born 21 December 1962) is a former Montenegrin footballer. He played for FK Sutjeska Nikšić, FK Novi Pazar, NK Dinamo Zagreb, NK Dinamo Inkovci and FK Vojvodina in the Yugoslav First League.

References

External links
http://www.fkvojvodina.com/rezultati.php?sezona=1991
http://forum.b92.net/topic/29741-ex-yu-fudbalska-statistika-po-godinama/page__st__242
http://forum.b92.net/topic/29741-ex-yu-fudbalska-statistika-po-godinama/page__st__30
http://www.parapsihopatologija.com/forums/index.php?showtopic=1130&st=1605
http://www.hrsport.net/SportnetKlub/Tema.aspx?pID=1857843

1962 births
Living people
Footballers from Nikšić
Association football defenders
Yugoslav footballers
FK Sutjeska Nikšić players
FK Novi Pazar players
GNK Dinamo Zagreb players
HNK Cibalia players
FK Vojvodina players
Yugoslav First League players